WIMG (1300 AM) is a radio station broadcasting a Gospel music format. Licensed to Ewing, New Jersey, the station is currently owned by Morris Broadcasting Company of New Jersey, Inc.

History

WIMG is the oldest radio station in New Jersey. On December 1, 1921, the U.S. Department of Commerce, which regulated radio at this time, adopted the first regulations formally establishing a broadcasting station category, which set aside the wavelength of 360 meters (833 kHz) for entertainment broadcasts, and 485 meters (619 kHz) for market and weather reports. The station was originally licensed to the 360 "entertainment" wavelength on December 4, 1922, as WOAX, to Franklyn J. Wolff (Monument Pottery Company) in Trenton. The original call letters were randomly assigned from a roster of available call signs.

In May 1923, the station was reassigned to 1250 kHz. On November 11, 1928, as part of a major reallocation implemented under the Federal Radio Commission's General Order 40, WOAX was assigned to 1280 kHz, sharing time on that frequency with WCAM in Camden and WCAP in Asbury Park.

Beginning in 1930, WOAX was associated with, and carried some of the broadcasts, of WHAP in New York City, a controversial station run by a dissident faction of Christian Science that was aggressively anti-Catholic. At the time Franklin Ford, president of the defenders society, stated that the two stations were the first in a projected national network. However, this ambitious plan was never realized, and in 1932 Ford arranged for WHAP to be sold.

In 1933 WOAX's call sign was changed to WTNJ. In March 1941, WTNJ and its two timeshare partners moved to 1310, with the implementation of the North American Regional Broadcasting Agreement. In 1949, WTNJ was granted permission to move to 1300 kHz, which ended its time sharing, although the station was now limited to only broadcasting during daytime hours.

WTNJ's call letters changed to WAAT in 1959. WAAT operated with Top 40, country and middle-of-the-road formats at various times. The WTNJ call sign returned in 1971, and a year later the station moved to a soul music format.

In 1979 the station became WIMG ("Imagination Radio") with a format featuring old-time radio programming. This policy was short-lived, and R&B and adult contemporary formats were tried in later years. In the 1980s WIMG was granted a license to operate full-time; its community of license was changed to Ewing as part of that process. By the late 1990s the present ownership had acquired the station and the current gospel format was established.

References

External links

FCC History Cards for WIMG (covering 1922-1981 as WOAX / WTNJ / WAAT / WIMG) 

Gospel radio stations in the United States
Radio stations established in 1922
Radio stations licensed before 1923 and still broadcasting
IMG